Original Sound is a Los Angeles, California-based record label. It was founded in the early 1950s by KPOP deejay Art Laboe. It began as a small label that specialized in compiling and re-releasing "oldies" R&B and rock 'n' roll songs.

History
The label pioneered the concept of reissuing older pop and rock hits, and sold millions of records on his Oldies But Goodies compilation albums, several of which made the national Billboard album charts. All 15 volumes of this series were later reissued on a best-selling CD series in the 1980s and 1990s, although track listings on each CD volume varied widely from the original LP issues with identical numbers, and some volumes contained none of the same songs as their original issues. Later on, the Double Shot Records catalog got bought out by Original Sound in ca. 1972.

The label's biggest self-recorded hit as a single was "Teen Beat" by drummer Sandy Nelson, reaching number four on Billboard in 1959.  Other successful Original Sound artists included:

 Preston Epps ("Bongo Rock" and "Bongo, Bongo, Bongo")
 The Music Machine ("Talk Talk" and "The People In Me") 
 Dyke & the Blazers ("Funky Broadway")
 Bobby Mac ("Walkin' Together" b/w "Keep On", OS-68)

The first few "Oldies But Goodies" LPs were hugely successful (Volume 1 reached #12 on the Billboard Album charts and stayed on the chart for 183 weeks).  Their success influenced other labels to put out compilations of their hits and near-hits, as well as helped validate the standing of songs like The Five Satins' "In the Still of the Night", which only reached #24 on the pop charts in 1956.

See also 
 List of record labels
 Doo wop
 Rockabilly

References

External Links
 

American record labels
Rhythm and blues record labels
Reissue record labels